Pop Talk is a Philippine television news magazine show broadcast by GMA News TV and GTV. Hosted by Tonipet Gaba, it premiered on March 1, 2011. The show concluded on October 5, 2021.

Production
The production was halted in March 2020 due to the enhanced community quarantine in Luzon caused by the COVID-19 pandemic. The show resumed its programming on November 14, 2020.

Accolades

References

External links
 
 

2011 Philippine television series debuts
2021 Philippine television series endings
Filipino-language television shows
GMA Integrated News and Public Affairs shows
GMA News TV original programming
GTV (Philippine TV network) original programming
Philippine documentary television series
Television productions suspended due to the COVID-19 pandemic